Theodoric II (– 19 November 1034) was Margrave of Lusatia from 1032 to 1034, the first of the Wettin dynasty.

Life
He was the only son of Count Dedo I, Count of Wettin ( – 1009) and his wife Thietburga, a daughter of Count Dietrich of Haldensleben, the first margrave of the Northern March. Theodoric thereby was a grandson of the Wettin progenitor Theodoric I.

At Christmas 1009, after his father was killed in a fierce struggle with Margrave Werner of the Northern March, Theodoric was vested with the County of Wettin in the Saxon Hassegau (ruling as Theodoric II) by King Henry II of Germany at Pöhlde. From 1015, he also appeared as a and count in the neighbouring Schwabengau. Upon the death of his uncle Frederick I, who had died without male issue in 1017, he inherited Eilenburg and Brehna. In 1018, Theodoric and his brother-in-law, Margrave Herman I of Meissen acted as witnesses when the Peace of Bautzen was concluded between Emperor Henry II and the Polish ruler Bolesław I the Brave, ending a lengthy German–Polish War.

From 1029, Emperor Conrad II again waged war against Poland. Bolesław's son and successor Mieszko II lost Lusatia and finally had to renounce his claims in the 1033 Treaty of Merseburg. According to the Annalista Saxo chronicles, Theodoric played a key role in the emperor's campaign and in turn could succeed the Lusatian margrave Odo II in 1032. However, he earned the hatred of his brother-in-law Eckard II of Meissen and was killed by his henchmen, whereafter Eckard became his successor in Lusatia. 

Theodoric's possessions were divided among his sons. As Count of Eilenburg, he was succeeded by his eldest son Dedi, who also became Margrave of Lusatia upon the death of Margrave Eckard II of Meissen in 1046.

Marriage and issue
Dietrich II of Wettin married Mathilda, daughter of Margrave Eckard I of Meissen. They had seven children:
 Dedi (ca. 1010–1075) the eldest son, who eventually became his successor as Margrave of Lusatia.
 Frederick (ca. 1020–1084), elected Bishop of Münster in 1063.
 Thimo (ca. 1034– ca. 1101), count of Wettin.
 Gero (ca. 1020–1089), count of Brehna. 
 Konrad (died 1040), count of Camburg. 
 Rikdag
 Ida (Hidda), married to Duke Spytihněv II of Bohemia.

Literature
Detlev Schwennicke. Europäische Stammtafeln: Stammtafeln zur Geschichte der Europäischen Staaten, Neue Folge ("European Family Trees: Family Trees for the History of European States, New Series"), Marburg, Germany: J. A. Stargardt
Stefan Pätzold. Die frühen Wettiner - Adelsfamilie und Hausüberlieferung bis 1221. Köln, Weimar, Wien, 1997.

References

990s births
1034 deaths

Year of birth uncertain
House of Wettin